The gnathosoma (from Greek ,  = "jaw" and ,  = "body") is the part of the body of the Acari (mites and ticks) comprising the mouth and feeding parts. These are the hypostome, the chelicerae and the pedipalps. It is also called the capitulum (however, this word also has other meanings). It is separated from the main body of the animal (the idiosoma) by a flexible section of the cuticle called the circumcapitular furrow or circumcapitular suture.

See also
 Subcapitulum

References

Arachnid anatomy
Acari